Michael Bernard McHugh (born 3 April 1971) is an Irish former professional footballer who played as a forward.

Career
Born in Letterkenny, McHugh played for Bradford City, Scarborough, Omagh Town, Derry City, Coleraine and Newry City.

References

1971 births
Living people
Republic of Ireland association footballers
Bradford City A.F.C. players
Scarborough F.C. players
Omagh Town F.C. players
Derry City F.C. players
Coleraine F.C. players
Newry City F.C. players
English Football League players
Association football forwards